Gabriele Adinolfi is an Italian far-right ideologue and essayist. Adinolfi was involved in Terza Posizione, a short-lived far-right group founded in 1979. Like other neo-fascists of his generation, he saw his enemy as the far-left and the Italian Social Movement (MSI). He founded several publications and a website called Noreporter.

He has self-published two books, namely Noi Terza Posizione (Us, Third Position) (2000) with Roberto Fiore and Il domani che ci appartenne (The tomorrow which belonged to us) (2005).

References

External links 
 Official website

Third Position
Italian neo-fascists
Living people
1954 births